Srđan Dabić (born 20 July 1962) is a Serbian business manager and former professional basketball player.

Playing career 
A point guard, Dabić played 13 seasons in the Yugoslav Federal League from 1978 to 1991. During that time, he played for Crvena zvezda on two occasions, Radnički Belgrade, and Šibenka. In 1991, he signed for a Sofia-based team Levski Totel of the Bulgarian National League.

National team career 
Dabić was a member of the Yugoslavia cadet team that won the gold medal at the 1979 European Championship for Cadets in Damascus, Syria. Over seven tournament games, he averaged 10.6 points per game.

Dabić was a member of the Yugoslavia junior team that won the silver medal at the 1980 European Championship for Juniors in Celje, Slovenia, Yugoslavia. Over seven tournament games, he averaged 10.9 points per game.

Business career 
In July 2003, Dabić was elected as a board member for the Crvena zvezda Basketball Club.

Dabić was a director of Lukoil Serbia, a Serbian branch of Russian multinational energy corporation Lukoil. In 2003, Dabić represented Lukoil in the privatization of a Serbian state gas company Beopetrol.

Reportedly, Dabić was a business partner of Siniša Mali, a former Mayor of Belgrade. According to OCCRP, Dabić's Bulgaria-based company Akladi sold 24 apartments to Mali in Bulgaria.

See also 
 List of KK Crvena zvezda players with 100 games played

References

1962 births
Living people
Basketball players from Belgrade
BC Levski Sofia players
BKK Radnički players
KK Crvena Zvezda executives
KK Crvena zvezda players
KK Šibenik players
Point guards
Businesspeople from Belgrade
Serbian basketball executives and administrators
Serbian expatriate basketball people in Bulgaria
Serbian expatriate basketball people in Croatia
Serbian men's basketball players
Yugoslav men's basketball players